Eva Ruth Spalding (December 19, 1883 - March 1969) was a British composer who wrote string quartets and piano music, and set texts by many poets to music.

Spalding was born in Blackheath, Kent, to Henry Spalding and his second wife Ellen. She was the youngest of eight children, with four half-siblings and three full siblings. Henry Spalding was a paper merchant.

Spalding studied at the Royal Academy of Music, where she passed the violin teacher exam in 1904. She also studied with Leopold Auer at the St. Petersburg Conservatory in Russia. After returning to England, she taught piano and violin privately and at Bradfield College.

Spalding set texts by the following poets to music: Léon Bazalgette, William Blake, Phineas Fletcher, Paul Fort, Fernand Gregh, George Herbert, Ioannes Papadiamantopoulos (as Jean Moréas), Edmund Spenser, Charles van Lerberghe, Clara Walsh, and Walt Whitman.

List of Songs by Eva Ruth Spalding

Spalding’s music was published by Maurice Senart. In addition to songs, her compositions included:

Piano 

Etude for the Left Hand
Prelude

Strings 

Poeme (violin and piano)   
String Quartet No. 1
String Quartet No. 2
String Quartet No. 3
String Quartet No. 4
String Quartet No. 5
Violin Sonata No. 1
Violin Sonata No. 2
Violin Sonata No. 3

References 

British women composers
1883 births
1969 deaths
String quartet composers